Euchlorostola anusia is a moth of the subfamily Arctiinae. It was described by Schaus in 1924. It is found in Mexico and Guatemala.

References

 Natural History Museum Lepidoptera generic names catalog

Arctiinae
Moths described in 1924